Cruijffiaans is the name given to the way of speaking, or a collection of sayings, made famous by Dutch association football player and coach Johan Cruijff (1947–2016), particularly "one-liners that hover somewhere between the brilliant and the banal".  An example is "Je moet altijd zorgen dat je één doelpunt meer scoort als de tegenstander" (You always have to make sure that you score one goal more than your opponent.)

Description

Cruijff's Dutch was not the generally accepted variation (Algemeen Beschaafd Nederlands or ABN), according to linguist Jan Stroop. Lexically, Cruijffiaans is noted for its syncretism of highly diverse linguistic registers, and combines a working class Amsterdam dialect and football lingo with words not frequently found in the language of football. Semantically, Cruijffiaans contains many tautologies and paradoxes that, while appearing mundane or self-evident, suggest a deeper level of meaning, a mysterious layer not normally attainable for the average speaker or listener. Syntactically, it uses the rules of Dutch grammar selectively and freely reorganizes word order. Other quirks, for instance, are that Cruijffiaans knows only one relative pronoun, wie.

Cruijff's aphorisms, neologisms, and bastardizations have proven influential, having been the subject of some ridicule, praise, and linguistic investigation. His pronouncements oscillate between pithy aphorism and "endless monologue"; Kees Fens said Cruijffiaans was an essayistic style that compares to stream of consciousness prose.

Legacy
A poll in 2007 by Amsterdam newspaper Het Parool asking readers about their favorite Cruijff saying found that it was Elk nadeel hep zijn voordeel ("Every disadvantage has its advantage"--hep being the Amsterdam pronunciation of heeft; linguist Jan Stroop noted that Renate Rubinstein had used that expression before Cruijff did, but thinks it unlikely Cruijff had gotten it from her), followed closely by Als ik zou willen dat je het begreep, legde ik het wel beter uit ("If I wanted you to understand it, I would have explained it better"). While Stroop said Cruijffiaans frequently was more murky than enlightening and that Cruijff's language was accepted because it was his, journalist and television presenter Hanneke Groenteman said it was hypnotic.

The Johan Cruyff Foundation, which promotes sports activity especially for disabled children, sells Delftware tiles with some of his expressions. In 2014, the organization published a daily calendar.

See also
 Bushism
 Putinisms
 "Yogi-isms"

References

External links
Ruimte op Links

Johan Cruyff
Dutch language
Dutch words and phrases
Eponyms
Quotations from sports
Terms for quotations of notable persons